Vanderhoof station is on the Canadian National Railway mainline in Vanderhoof, British Columbia.  The station is served by Via Rail's Jasper – Prince Rupert train.

History
The station was open in 1912-13 by the Grand Trunk Pacific Railway.  The town site was named after Herbert Vanderhoof, a publicity agent from Chicago that was retained by the railway to attract  settlers to the region.

Footnotes

External links 
Via Rail Station Description

Via Rail stations in British Columbia
Railway stations in Canada opened in 1913
1913 establishments in British Columbia